In enzymology, a tryptophan 2'-dioxygenase is an enzyme that catalyzes the chemical reaction

L-tryptophan +  +   (indol-3-yl)glycolaldehyde +  + 

Classification 

This enzyme belongs to the family of oxidoreductases, specifically those acting on single donors with O2 as oxidant and incorporation of two atoms of oxygen into the substrate (oxygenases). The oxygen incorporated need not be derived from O miscellaneous.

Nomenclature 

The systematic name of this enzyme class is L-tryptophan:oxygen 2'-oxidoreductase (side-chain-cleaving). Other names in common use include indole-3-alkane alpha-hydroxylase, tryptophan side-chain alpha,beta-oxidase, tryptophan side chain oxidase II, tryptophan side-chain oxidase, TSO, indolyl-3-alkan alpha-hydroxylase, tryptophan side chain oxidase type I, TSO I, TSO II, and tryptophan side chain oxidase.

Biological role 

This enzyme participates in tryptophan metabolism.  It employs one cofactor, heme.

References

 
 

EC 1.13.99
Heme enzymes
Enzymes of unknown structure